Fans of American singer Michael Jackson are known as Moonwalkers.

History

Origins

Jacksonmania
In the beginning of the 1970s, Jackson and his brothers would embark on tours across the globe, performing in front of millions of fans while recording hits at a rapid pace during the Jackson-mania. Adulation from fans young and old, male and female, black and white, would become par for the course. Jackson-Mania would reach a fever pitch around 1984 which saw three generations gather in front of a television set in many households to watch the "Thriller" music video.  Years following the Jacksons' Victory Tour, Jackson Mania would turn to Michael-Mania, also known as Michael Jackson-Mania, as he established himself as a solo artist.  Michael-Mania experienced a resurrection days after his death on June 25, 2009. Within the weeks that followed his death, as he would go on to sell 35 million records worldwide, with 16.1 million albums being sold in the U.S. alone.

Reaction to child sexual abuse allegations against Jackson

Reaction to first child sexual abuse allegations
Despite the negative attitude of the media, the public still supported Jackson. A phone-in poll conducted by A Current Affair—known for its unfavorable coverage of the allegations—found that more than 80 percent of callers did not believe the Chandlers. A poll of teenagers—Jackson's central fan base at the time—also reported that 75 percent did not believe the allegations; this rose to nearly 90 percent amongst African-American teenagers. Two-thirds of children between the ages of 13 to 15—the approximate age of Jordan Chandler at the time—believed he was innocent. A poll conducted by Entertainment Weekly showed that only 12 percent of adults believed the allegations, and only eight percent of respondents indicated that they were less likely to buy a product endorsed by the entertainer. The same poll also concluded that public opinion of Jackson had risen since the allegations, with Jackson's past records selling at a faster rate.

Reaction to second sexual abuse allegations

Fans continued to support Jackson in the 2005 trial. Fans unfavorably felt about the media coverage of the case accusing it of being biased, demonizing Jackson and jeopardizing his chances for a fair trial. They came in throngs from all over the world to gather outside the Santa Barbara County Courthouse in Santa Maria during jury selection holding signs of support. Some continued to show their support when Jackson was hospitalized with flu, gathering outside the Marian Medical Center where he was staying. Jackson's fans continued to show their support throughout his trial.

Reaction to Jackson's death

News of Jackson's death triggered an outpouring of grief around the world. Fans gathered outside the UCLA Medical Center, Neverland Ranch, his Holmby Hills home, the Hayvenhurst Jackson family home in Encino, the Apollo Theater in New York, and at Hitsville U.S.A., the old Motown headquarters in Detroit where Jackson's career began, now the Motown Museum. Streets around the hospital were blocked off, and across America people left offices and factories to watch the breaking news on television. A small crowd, including the city's mayor, gathered outside his childhood home in Gary, where the flag on city hall was flown at half staff in his honor. Fans in Hollywood initially gathered around the Walk of Fame star of another Michael Jackson, as they were unable to access Jackson's star, which had been temporarily covered by equipment in place for the Brüno film premiere. Grieving fans and memorial tributes relocated from the talk radio host's star the next day.

From Odessa to Brussels, and beyond, fans held their own memorial gatherings.

On June 25, 2010, the first anniversary of Jackson's death, fans traveled to Los Angeles to pay tribute. They visited Jackson's star on the Hollywood Walk of Fame, his family home, and Forest Lawn Memorial Park. Many carried sunflowers and other tributes to leave at the sites.

On June 26, 2010, fans marched in front of the Los Angeles Police Department's Robbery-Homicide Division at the old Parker Center building, and assembled a petition with thousands of signatures, demanding justice in the homicide investigation.

In 2014, 34 members of the French-based Michael Jackson Community fan club sued Jackson's doctor for the emotional damage caused by the singer's death. Five of them were awarded one euro each since they were able to prove their suffering. Their lawyer, Emmanuel Ludot, stated that to his knowledge this was "the first time in the world that the notion of emotional damage in connection with a popstar has been recognised". 2.5 to 3 billion people across the world streamed his burial.

Fan activism
On December 10, 2010, as a promotion of Jackson's first posthumous album of previously unreleased tracks Michael a  poster depicting the album artwork from Michael was erected at the Rectory Farm in Middlesex, England, by fans which broke a Guinness World Record for the largest poster in the world.

In 2019, after the release of HBO's documentary Leaving Neverland, Jackson fans demanded the Sundance Film Festival cancel the premiere. Fans protested outside Channel 4's office, and led an internet campaign against the film. They also crowdfunded an advertising campaign to publicise Jackson's innocence, with the slogan "Facts don't lie. People do" on buses and bus stops.

In July 2019, three Jackson fan clubs in France, Michael Jackson Community, the MJ Street and On The Line, have filed a suit against two of the late alleged abuse victims for sullying his image in Leaving Neverland, using the defamation laws that make it an offence to wrongly sully the image of a dead person. US or British laws do not provide such protection to the deceased.

Conventions
The Jackson Family Foundation, in conjunction with Voiceplate, presented "Forever Michael", an event bringing together Jackson family members, celebrities, fans, supporters and the community to celebrate and honor his legacy. A portion of the proceeds were presented to some of Jackson's favorite charities.

A convention for the European community, the Kingvention, was established in the United Kingdom in 2015, following the success witnessed in Jackson–related events in the continent. All special guests worked closely with Jackson.
 2015: Rob Hoffman, Diana Walczak, Jonathan Morrish and Eddie Wolfl
 2016: Dan Beck, Thom Russo and Yuko Sumida Jackson
 2017: Dorian Holley, Eddie Garcia and Steven Paul Whitsitt
 2019: Larry Stessel, Darryl Phinnessee and Siedah Garrett

Charity and fundraising
Michael Jackson Fans For Charity (MJFFC) is a fan-made charity inspired by Jackson.

Awards
The MJJCommunity won Best Fan Forum at the O Music Awards 2011.

Criticism
Mike Pesca of Slate and Kevin Fallon of The Daily Beast described fans as conspiracy theorists due to doubts over Jackson's sexual abuse allegations.

See also
 Beatlemania, from which Jacksonmania gets its name
 Thrill the World, an annual gathering of fans each October

References 

Michael Jackson
Celebrity fandom
Music fandom